Aleksi Pahkasalo (born 18 July 1992) is a Finnish footballer who plays for VPS.

References

Finnish footballers
Association football midfielders
Association football forwards
1992 births
Living people
Helsingin Jalkapalloklubi players
PK-35 Vantaa (men) players
Derby City Rovers players
Kotkan Työväen Palloilijat players
Kokkolan Palloveikot players
Vaasan Palloseura players
Kakkonen players
Ykkönen players